The Zakón Súdnyi Liúdem ("Law for Judging the People" or "Court Law for the People") is the oldest preserved Slavic legal text. Its source was Byzantine law and it was written in Old Church Slavonic in the late ninth or early tenth century.

In the all-Slavic legal tradition this legal monument is considered to be the first actually Slavic, but in the Bulgarian legal tradition it is preceded by the so-called Krum's laws.

The oldest (short) version contains thirty chapters primarily of penal law adapted from the Ecloga. Parts of this version are word-for-word translation of the source.

The place of origin of the Zakón Súdnyi Liúdem is a topic of controversy. It has been assigned between the First Bulgarian Empire and Great Moravia. On the basis of Frankish and Bavarian legal patterns in the text, the Slovenian legal historian Sergij Vilfan suggested the late 9th century Principality of Lower Pannonia as a likely place of origin, as part of the state-building process initiated by prince Kocel; the plausibility of this thesis has been recently supported by historian Peter Štih. Its English translators, Dewey and Kleimola, prefer the Moravian theory. Despite its origins, all surviving manuscripts come from Russia. The text itself seems to have reached Russia before the end of the tenth century. It was widely copied in Russia and has some influence on Russian law, but outside of Russia it was forgotten.

References

Literature

Editions
 Закон судный людем краткой редакции, М., 1961.
 Закон судный людем пространной и сводной редакции, М., 1961.
H. W. Dewey and A. M. Kleimola, eds. Zakon Sudnyj Ljudem (Court Law for the People). Ann Arbor, 1977.Contains an English translation.

Sources
 Павлов А. С., Первоначальный славяно- русский Номоканон, Казань, 1869.
 Флоринский Т. Д., Древнейший памятник болг. права «Закон судный людем», К., 1904
 Бобчев С., Един паматник на старото българско право (Законъ соудный людьмъ), «Периодическо списание на Българското книжовно Дружество», С., 1901–02, кн. 62
 Ганев В., Закон соудный людьмъ, С., 1959
 Андреев М., Является ли «Закон соудный людьмъ» древнеболгарским юридическим памятником?, в сб.: Славянский архив, M., 1959;
 Hube R., О znaczeniu Prawa Rzymskiego i Rzymsko-Byzantynskiego u narodów slovianskich, Warsz., 1868
 Oroschakoff H., Ein Denkmal des bulgarischen Rechts, Stuttg., 1915
 Kadlec K., Introduction а l'étude comparative de l’histoire du droit public des peuples slaves, P., 1933.
 Максимович К. А. Законъ соудьныи людьмъ. Источниковедческие и лингвистические аспекты исследования славянского юридического памятника. М., 2004.

External links
 Статья: Советская историческая энциклопедия. — М.: Советская энциклопедия . Под ред. Е. М. Жукова. 1973—1982.
 Статья с болгарского сайта в Роден Край
 Статья с Historic.Ru

Legal history of Bulgaria
East Slavic manuscripts
Church Slavonic manuscripts
Society of Kievan Rus'
Medieval legal codes
Legal history of Russia
Legal history of Belarus
Legal history of Ukraine
9th-century Christian texts
9th-century manuscripts
Cyrillic manuscripts
Old East Slavic